Spider-Man and His Amazing Friends may refer to the following shows:

 Spider-Man and His Amazing Friends (1981 TV series), a 1981 cartoon series
 Spidey and His Amazing Friends (2021 TV series), a 2021 Disney Junior cartoon